Cattaraugus is a village in Cattaraugus County, New York, United States. The population was 996 at the 2020 census. The village lies in the northeast part of the town of New Albion, north of  Salamanca.

History 

In 1828, the brothers Calvin and Arad Rich settled in the hills surrounding the area. Cattaraugus developed most after the arrival of the Erie Railroad in 1851. Shortly after, the village became a boomtown growing to 1,500 inhabitants and even being visited by US President Millard Fillmore. By 1860 the township boasted 305 dwellings, 1557 oxen, 383 horses, and 8 school districts with 649 children in school. In the same year, it is well documented Abraham Lincoln had come to visit. Other prominent visitors include US Presidents Teddy Roosevelt and Franklin D. Roosevelt. As well as Mark Twain who then named his housecat “Cattaraugus"   The village was incorporated in 1882. Its name derives from Cattaraugus Creek.

The Cattaraugus Village Commercial Historic District was listed on the National Register of Historic Places in 2014.

Geography
Cattaraugus is located in the northern part of the town of New Albion at  (42.330044, -78.865673).

NY Route 353 and Skinner Hollow pass through the village. Cattaraugus County Route 12 (which follows the briefly designated NY 264 of the 1930s), the only county route in the county to enter a village, enters the village from the northeast and terminates within the village. The village is built primarily on a hillside; the southwestern portion of the village (around Route 353) is on the highest ground, while a series of side streets run downhill from Route 353 heading northeast. Only two of the village's streets run uphill from Route 353: Rumsey Street (the easternmost tip of Waite Hollow Road) on the village's southern boundary and West Street at the peak of the hill.

Since 2013, the Seneca Transit System has provided public bus service to the village.

The New York and Lake Erie Railroad terminates at a Setterstix plant in Cattaraugus after the portion of the railway southeast of Cattaraugus was decommissioned in the early 1990s. The rail service has been disrupted by floods and landslides since the late 2000s. The right-of-way of the portion heading southeast from Cattaraugus is now the Pat McGee Trail, which was established in 2005.

Demographics

As of the census of 2000, there were 1,075 people, 437 households, and 281 families residing in the village. The population density was 959.6 people per square mile (370.6/km2). There were 485 housing units at an average density of 432.9 per square mile (167.2/km2). The racial makeup of the village was 98.51% White, 0.56% Native American, 0.28% from other races, and 0.65% from two or more races. Hispanic or Latino of any race were 1.40% of the population.

There were 437 households, out of which 34.8% had children under the age of 18 living with them, 49.2% were married couples living together, 10.5% had a female householder with no husband present, and 35.5% were non-families. 30.9% of all households were made up of individuals, and 14.6% had someone living alone who was 65 years of age or older. The average household size was 2.44 and the average family size was 3.07.

In the village, the population was spread out, with 28.0% under the age of 18, 7.2% from 18 to 24, 25.8% from 25 to 44, 23.2% from 45 to 64, and 15.9% who were 65 years of age or older. The median age was 37 years. For every 100 females, there were 99.8 males. For every 100 females age 18 and over, there were 91.1 males.

The median income for a household in the village was $30,664, and the median income for a family was $35,417. Males had a median income of $27,434 versus $19,833 for females. The per capita income for the village was $16,605. About 7.4% of families and 11.0% of the population were below the poverty line, including 14.2% of those under age 18 and 4.7% of those age 65 or over.

Economy
The Cattaraugus-Little Valley Central School is the largest employer in the village. The school's only active campus is located at the former Cattaraugus Central School building in the northeast corner of the village on County Route 12; it was constructed in 1954 as a high school, then expanded in 1991 for an elementary school wing and again in 2011 to accommodate added students from the takeover of Little Valley Central School. A former elementary school, abandoned since 1992, is in the center of the village.

Industry is a significant portion of the Cattaraugus economy, and two factories (one for the Chester-Jensen company and the other for lollipop stick manufacturer Setterstix) are located in the village; a third, Frank Ralphs (which manufactures composite panels), is located just south of the village line. The only national franchise in Cattaraugus is a Dollar General, which opened in 2010. Other businesses include the Bank of Cattaraugus (founded 1882, considered the first bank in the region), P & C Gas Measurement Service, a Brooks Market grocery store (now closed), Jenny Lee Country Store (now known as "The Feed Mill"), Pritchard's Hardware, and the Corner Drug Store pharmacy. The village's only automobile dealership, Illig Chevrolet Pontiac, closed in 2008 as a result of the General Motors bankruptcy.

Notable people
William Buffington Jr., former member of the New York State Assembly
Alexander Chambers, Union general in American Civil War
John P. Darling, former New York state senator
Clarence B. Farrar, influential psychiatrist
Ezra F. Kysor, architect
Joel H. Lyman, Medal of Honor recipient
Samuel Allen Rice, colonel in the 33rd regiment of Iowa during the American Civil War
Peter Linebaugh, radical historian, teacher, and author

References

External links
 Town of New Albion/Village of Cattaraugus official website
 Little Valley Area Chamber of Commerce

Villages in New York (state)
Villages in Cattaraugus County, New York